School dropouts in Latin America refer to people who leave school before graduating in this particular region. Given that the large majority of children and adolescents in the region are enrolled in the education system, it can be argued that school dropouts in Latin America are predominantly due to the weakening of a link, which for a variety of reasons wore away and finally broke. The fact that school drop out intensifies specifically when young men and women are between the ages of 15 and 17 years and that it increases disproportionately in populations that are under-served in other ways highlights the difficulty the education system has in interacting with populations in situations that are more complex than those with which it was designed to cope. Adolescents and young people from the most disadvantaged social sectors who are typically the first generation from their families to attend secondary school are six times more likely to be out of school.

Main factors of school dropout 

When analysing the household surveys of some countries in the Latin American region – notably, those of Bolivia, Chile, Panama, Costa Rica, Nicaragua and Paraguay – researching the opinions of boys, girls, adolescents, young people as well as their families on the reasons they drop out of school, some recurring features surface that enable us to group the analyses into two main categories.

Material dimension of education 
The first is directly related to ‘the material dimension’ of education. In this case, financial difficulties are the main reason why families do not manage to keep their children and adolescents in school. This is compounded by the deficit of education services and the difficulties caused by chronic illness or disability. These factors loom particularly large among the causes of school drop out in primary education. Later, when they reach adolescence, the work done both outside and inside the home seems, according to those involved and their families, to be the most direct cause of school drop out. Paid work is in fact mentioned by only 20% of young people as the cause of school drop out while a further 20% identify work related to parenting at a young age or the direct care of other members of the household as the reasons for drop out.

It is clear from these findings that the link between paid work, caregiving and interruption of each educational trajectory could be thought of as the outcome of family dynamics due to persistent shortages and deprivations. This means that young people dropping out of school is one of the consequences of the difficulties encountered by adults trying to achieve a minimal level of well-being to protect the educational trajectories of their adolescents. In emergency family situations, the roles assumed by youth within the family dynamics for producing well-being are always gender differentiated. Thus, over 70% of those reporting work-related reasons as the main cause of drop out are males while 97% of the females surveyed state that parenting duties and associated domestic tasks are the main causes of school drop out.

In other words, the intensification of paid work and of care work during adolescence – and its impact on each educational trajectory – is a clear expression of the roles assumed by young people in contexts of persistent material privations. Family dynamics while seeking to achieve adequate levels of well-being undoubtedly form a complex web of interactions that, in many cases, affect educational trajectories.

The information from the household surveys in the region confirm, to a large extent, a close link between the participation of young people in the family dynamics of the production of well-being and school drop out. This was done by investigating the relationship of the causes for drop out with the school, conditions of economic activities, family structure and constitution of a new household.

A first approximation enabling us to gauge this group of out-of-school young people shows how the increase in care work among women, men entering the job market early, early motherhood and fatherhood, and a separation from the family of origin affect 39% of them. Indeed, 67% of the young people who left their educational trajectories early are men who work or unemployed women who live together with small children and take care of the members of the household. In any case, the information analysed shows strong indications that a quarter of out-of-school youth aged 18 to 24 years who left school before completing their secondary education have brothers and sisters or other young family members who were adolescent fathers and mothers. The behaviour patterns analysed also revealed that many young people left the household in which they were raised to set up a new household. An over-representation of this subgroup of adolescents and young people who broke off their educational trajectories before completing their secondary level was found in considerably greater proportions among the poorest households, in rural areas and among women. When this cause of school drop out is taken into account, the numbers point to a social gap of 22% within the poorest sectors, a geographical divide of 7% within rural areas and a gender gap of 10% of women.

Subjective dimension of education 
The other major group of factors for school drop out is more subtle and directly connected to the analytical framework from which interpretations are made. These factors fall into the ‘subjective dimension’ of the educational experience. The surveys revealed that 22% of out-of-school boys and girls aged 10 or 11 years state that they are in this situation because they have no interest in studying. This percentage jumps to 38% in adolescents aged 15 to 17 years who also provided this reason for their disengagement with the education system.

With the challenge taken on by the countries in the region to guarantee the right to education, this ‘lack of interest’ in studying mentioned by boys, girls, adolescents and young people makes it clear that access to educational services is not something that happens naturally. It is the result of a combination of conditions and doctrines of the educational services linked with the representations that the young subjects make of them.

Intra-school factors associated with school dropout 
The process of construction of the identity of youth affects – and is affected by – the way in which educational experience unfolds. In this respect, the quantitative analysis of factors associated with school drop out within which intra-school factors present a high relative weight should be complemented with a review of these variables, an analysis of violence as a specific factor and, finally, an analysis of the interaction of the reciprocal perceptions of teachers and learners in the school context.

The subjective push factor 
The start of the last decade saw a consolidation of the distinction between extra-school factors (poverty, rurality, gender, ethnicity, among others) and intra-school factors (low performance, problems of conduct, teacher authoritarianism, academic performance, perception on the quality of educational provision) associated with school drop out. Various studies have characterized this reality, such as the case carried out by Espíndola and León (2002), who state that:

In this manner, the characteristics and very structure of the education system together with the intra-school agents themselves would be directly responsible for generating its expelling elements, whether on account of its inadequate socializing action or because of its inability to channel or contain the influence of the (adverse) socio-economic environment in which children and young people develop.

Violence as a critical push factor 
A particularly pertinent phenomenon in this scenario is the problem of violence. Escotto (2015), Trucco and Ullmann (2015) recognize a set of causes of violence affecting the young people concerned. Notably, the growing inequality and exclusion (or exclusions); the series of civil conflicts; drug trafficking; migratory processes and deportations; violence within the family; young people lacking a sense of belonging; the stigmatization of youth; and institutional disaffiliation. To this are added two cultural classifications: a generalized culture validating violence as a mechanism for settling conflicts; and a low tolerance of differences in very unequal societies, which fosters discrimination.

Specifically in the educational sphere, violence occurs more or less extensively, aggravating three types of key tensions:
 violent behaviour versus the school as a safe and protected place for training the new generations in citizen and democratic conduct and values
 the school as a space regulating behaviour (shaping a harmonious school community) versus the emergence of the external space (for example, the reshaping of sociability regarding ICTs and their impact on the daily life of youth)
 the educational institution directed towards a homogeneous population versus a new diverse school population. López (2011) observes the latter tension as ‘... an imbalance in appraisal terms between the student the school would like to have and the actual student in the classroom from day to day. Not only is it observed that the new students are different but it is also clear that this difference generates uneasiness which, furthermore, is connoted and valued negatively’.
This assertion could explain the strong daily expression of violent behaviour in the school space, both in the form of institutional violence and in the case of aggression among peers or reactions to environmental discrimination. Addressing these situations requires not only rules, consequences and sanctions but more importantly backup measures and the development of personal capacities of tolerance and conflict management, all of which require resources and training facilities that are not currently being provided by the secondary school.

Reciprocal representations between adolescents and teachers 
The reciprocal representations between adolescents and their teachers also determine both the various learner trajectories and even the continued presence of some young people in the secondary school. Currently, there is a significant number of young people who have lost faith in the school. Confirming this observation, the national youth surveys conducted in the countries in the region (with their methodological variability and certain local adaptations) highlight the persistence of the traditional models of assessment of the role of the school which is under strain due to many problems, such as the widening educational divides according to socio-economic backgrounds, physical and psychological violence, and the imbalances between learning processes and the labour market, among other factors.

At the regional level, a third of the young people interviewed strongly question the relevance of the school as the main socializing institution; this trend is even more accentuated in the Southern Cone. The specifics, however, vary. Nearly 20% of the region agree on the role of teachers and contents, their instrumentality for work or violence in the educational environment, with the exception of Central America and Brazil, where the criticisms in all respects remain at a little over 35%.

Among young Mexicans (according to the 2005 National Youth Survey), the reasons for choosing to study are linked to the possibility of having a good job (58%), which means that education continues to be viewed as a possible means to obtain social promotion and mobility. In Argentina (according to the 2009 National Youth Survey in Argentina), some 56% of those surveyed, regardless of their age, stated that youth should study and not work, which confirms the value of education in the social construct and the importance given, above all, to the right to education. In this respect, many of those polled (whatever their age) highly value education credentials and are confident that this will help them achieve social insertion.

In Guatemala (according to the First National Survey of Youth in Guatemala – ENJU, 2011), youth consider that the education they receive, or have received, is relevant for further learning or for obtaining greater knowledge (40%) while a similar proportion state that education enables them to get a good job, improve their financial situation or even help their family members (37.3%). A lower proportion, 14.3%, of young people see education’s role as developing socialization capacities, such as getting to know people, making friends, obtaining prestige or meeting social expectations. The survey also revealed that some 43% of these young people have suffered teasing or derision at school (i.e. psychological violence) and 30.8% have been victims of physical violence.

Among young Uruguayans (according to the Third National Survey of Adolescence and Youth – ENAJ, 2013), the main reason stated by 45.1% of them for attending secondary school is ‘to acquire training’. The reasoning statement provided on the survey, stating ‘you hope/were hoping to improve your social position by studying’ scored a mere 6.2%.

In Colombia (from the data of the 2000 National Youth Survey), youth consider that first among the factors most contributing to success (in descending order) is personality (38%), the second is preparation (24%) and the third is effort (21%). Teachers, however, rated last in the importance attributed to them by young people as socializing agents in daily life – after mother, brothers and sisters, father, friends and boyfriend or girlfriend. Across the board, youth surveys in the various countries indicate that the lack of money (for transport or enrollment) is the main reason for school drop out.

See also 
 High school dropouts
 High school dropouts in the United States
 Expulsion (education)

Sources

References 

Free content from UNESCO
Education in Latin America
Counterculture
Youth culture